The 1900–01 collegiate men's basketball season in the United States began in December 1900, progressed through the regular season, and concluded in March 1901.

Season headlines 

 In February 1943, the Helms Athletic Foundation retroactively selected Yale as its national champion for the 1900–01 season.
 In 1995, the Premo-Porretta Power Poll retroactively selected Bucknell as its national champion for the 1900–01 season.

Regular season

Conference winners 

NOTE: The Western Conference (the future Big Ten Conference) did not sponsor an official conference season or recognize a regular-season champion until the 1905–06 season. In 1900–01, Purdue (12–0) went undefeated.

References